Ivan Mamut (born 30 April 1997) is a Croatian professional footballer who plays as a forward for Malaysia Super League club Terengganu.

Club career
Mamut started his senior career with HNK Hajduk Split. After that, he played for NK Hrvace and NK Primorac 1929, In 2016, he signed for NK Inter Zaprešić in the Croatian First Football League, where he has made seventy-two appearances and scored thirteen goals. In summer 2021, Mamut joined FCSB. In January 2023, Ivan Mamut has signed a one year contract deal for Malaysia super league club Terengganu.

Career statistics

Club

Honours

Universitatea Craiova
Cupa României: 2020–21

References

External links
 
 Ivan Mamut: I dream of the day when I will return to Poljud 
 Ivan Mamut: I am satisfied with the games in Hrvace and Primorac, and the goals for the national team came as a icing on the cake 
 Drama on Poljud: 'I'll throw myself off the balcony!'

1997 births
Living people
Footballers from Split, Croatia
Association football forwards
Croatian footballers
NK Hrvace players
NK Primorac 1929 players
NK Inter Zaprešić players
NK Sesvete players
CS Universitatea Craiova players
FC Steaua București players
Croatian Football League players
First Football League (Croatia) players
Liga I players
Croatian expatriate footballers
Expatriate footballers in Romania
Croatian expatriate sportspeople in Romania